Frederick Howard Whalley (8 October 1898 – 25 April 1976) was an English professional footballer who played in the Football League for Leeds United, Grimsby Town, Preston North End and Fulham as a goalkeeper.

Personal life 
Whalley enlisted as a reservist in the Loyal North Lancashire Regiment of the British Army in November 1913, whilst working as a cotton spinner. After Britain's declaration of war on Germany in August 1914, he was mobilised and arrived on the Western Front one month later. Whalley saw action through the winter operations of 1914–1915, but was court-martialed in January 1915 for falling asleep at his post. He was sentenced to one year's hard labour and owing to a case of trench foot, he was moved from Rouen to Britain. In November 1915, he returned to his battalion, but was reprimanded after going AWOL for three days. Whalley returned to the front in January 1916 and was again evacuated after another case of trench foot, before being transferred to the King's Regiment (Liverpool) and then to the Labour Corps in March 1917. He was discharged in December 1918, one month after the Armistice. After his retirement from football in the mid-1920s, Whalley became a policeman in Preston and later lived in Eccles.

Career statistics

References

1898 births
English footballers
English Football League players
British Army personnel of World War I
Loyal Regiment soldiers
King's Regiment (Liverpool) soldiers
Footballers from Bolton
Association football goalkeepers
Royal Pioneer Corps soldiers
Preston North End F.C. players
Grimsby Town F.C. players
Leeds United F.C. players
Fulham F.C. players
1976 deaths
British police officers
British Army personnel who were court-martialled
English prisoners and detainees
Prisoners and detainees of the British military
Child soldiers in World War I
Military personnel from Lancashire